Raimo Matias Manninen (born September 17, 1955, in Lahti) is a retired male javelin thrower from Finland. He competed at the 1984 Summer Olympics in Los Angeles, California, finishing in 13th place. He set his personal best (93.42 metres) with the old javelin in 1984.

Achievements

References
sports-reference

1955 births
Living people
Sportspeople from Lahti
Finnish male javelin throwers
Athletes (track and field) at the 1984 Summer Olympics
Olympic athletes of Finland
20th-century Finnish people
21st-century Finnish people